Allan Sydney Lewis (born December 12, 1941) is a Panamanian former professional baseball player.  He was an outfielder and pinch runner over parts of 6 seasons (1967–1973) with the Kansas City/Oakland Athletics.  Lewis was a member of the 1972 and 1973 World Series champion Athletics.  For his career he batted .207 with 1 home run and 44 stolen bases in 156 games. Lewis is one of only seven players with more career game appearances than plate appearances.

He was dubbed "The Panamanian Express" for his base-stealing ability and his country of origin, in contrast to the train run called the Panama Limited.

As a minor leaguer with the Leesburg Athletics in 1966, Lewis set a minor league single-season record with 116 steals, which stood until 1980, when Alan Wiggins stole 120.

References

External links

1941 births
Living people
Albuquerque Dukes players
Baltimore Orioles scouts
Birmingham A's players
Cleveland Indians scouts
Daytona Beach Islanders players
Iowa Oaks players
Kansas City Athletics players
Leesburg A's players
Lewiston Broncs players
Lodi Crushers players
Major League Baseball outfielders
Major League Baseball players from Panama
Oakland Athletics players
Panamanian expatriate baseball players in the United States
Sportspeople from Colón, Panama
Philadelphia Phillies scouts